Irina Rîngaci (born 23 August 2001) is a Moldovan freestyle wrestler. She won the gold medal in the women's 65 kg event at the 2021 World Wrestling Championships in Oslo, Norway. She is the first female wrestler representing Moldova to win a gold medal at the World Wrestling Championships. She is also a two-time gold medalist at the European Wrestling Championships.

Career 

She finished in 4th place in the girls' 57 kg event at the 2018 Summer Youth Olympics held in Buenos Aires, Argentina. In 2019, she won one of the bronze medals in the 62 kg event at the World U23 Wrestling Championship held in Budapest, Hungary.

She won the silver medal in the women's 65 kg event at the 2020 Individual Wrestling World Cup held in Belgrade, Serbia. In March 2021, she competed at the European Qualification Tournament in Budapest, Hungary hoping to qualify for the 2020 Summer Olympics in Tokyo, Japan. In April 2021, she won the gold medal in her event at the 2021 European Wrestling Championships in Warsaw, Poland. In May 2021, she failed to qualify for the Olympics at the World Olympic Qualification Tournament held in Sofia, Bulgaria. Later that month, she won the gold medal in her event at the European U23 Wrestling Championship held in Skopje, North Macedonia. At the 2021 World Junior Wrestling Championships held in Ufa, Russia, she also won the gold medal in her event.

In 2022, she won the gold medal in the women's 68 kg event at the Dan Kolov & Nikola Petrov Tournament held in Veliko Tarnovo, Bulgaria. She also won the gold medal in the 68 kg event at the 2022 European U23 Wrestling Championship held in Plovdiv, Bulgaria. In that same month, she won the gold medal in the 68 kg event at the European Wrestling Championships held in Budapest, Hungary. A few months later, she won the silver medal in her event at the Matteo Pellicone Ranking Series 2022 held in Rome, Italy.

In September 2022, she won one of the bronze medals in the 68kg event at the 2022 World Wrestling Championships held in Belgrade, Serbia. A month later, she also won one of the bronze medals in her event at the 2022 U23 World Wrestling Championships held in Pontevedra, Spain.

She won one of the bronze medals in the women's 68kg event at the 2023 Grand Prix Zagreb Open held in Zagreb, Croatia. She also won one of the bronze medals in her event at the 2023 European U23 Wrestling Championships held in Bucharest, Romania.

Achievements

References

External links 

 

Living people
2001 births
Moldovan female sport wrestlers
Wrestlers at the 2018 Summer Youth Olympics
European Wrestling Championships medalists
World Wrestling Championships medalists
European Wrestling Champions
21st-century Moldovan women